The Chychyklia is a river in Ukraine and a right tributary of the Southern Bug that flows through Odessa Oblast and Mykolaiv Oblast at the border between the Podolian Upland and Black Sea Lowland within the Ukrainian steppe. The river often dries away for up to six months.

References

Dry or seasonal streams
Rivers of Mykolaiv Oblast
Rivers of Odesa Oblast